Renall Street railway station is an urban single-platform railway station on Renall Street in the Wairarapa town of Masterton in New Zealand’s North Island.  Renall Street is one of three railway stations in Masterton, the others being Masterton and Solway.

As part of the Wairarapa station upgrade programme to prepare stations for the new SW-class passenger carriages, this station was closed from 14 May 2007 until early July 2007.

History 

As the construction of the Wairarapa Line progressed in 1880, the rails reached the "Upper Plains crossing" in late August 1880.  On 28 August a special train conveyed members of parliament and their families from Wellington to the "Upper Plains crossing" where some picnicked, while others were taken by coach into town to refresh themselves at a hotel.

In 1936, Renall Street became a stopping place for railcars, coinciding with the introduction of the Wairarapa railcars.  Despite strong public support, it was not until 1937 that a shelter and platform were provided at the Upper Plains crossing.  The station also had several private sidings serving oil companies and other industrial interests.  These sidings have been removed.

Connecting Services 
A nearby bus stop allows passengers to connect with bus Route 201 (Masterton West) to the town centre.

Gallery

References

Footnotes

External links
 Passenger service timetables from Metlink and Tranz Metro.

Masterton
Rail transport in Wellington
Public transport in the Wellington Region
Buildings and structures in the Wairarapa
Railway stations in New Zealand
Railway stations opened in 1936
1936 establishments in New Zealand